Telmatobufo bullocki is a species of frog in the family Calyptocephalellidae. It is endemic to Chile, and is only known from a few locations in the Cordillera de Nahuelbuta, a part of the Chilean Coast Range. It is extremely rare; extensive fieldwork in 1992–2002 turned up only a single adult. It occurs in fast-flowing streams in temperate Nothofagus forest. The tadpoles are free-swimming and feed on algae growing on submerged rocks. It is threatened by siltation of streams caused by clear-cutting. It occurs within the Nahuelbuta National Park.

References

Telmatobufo
Amphibians of Chile
Endemic fauna of Chile
Taxa named by Karl Patterson Schmidt
Amphibians described in 1952
Taxonomy articles created by Polbot